Mount Nickerson is a broad mountain, 1,480 m, standing between Lennox-King and Beaver Glaciers, 4 nautical miles (7 km) southwest of Yeates Bluff in Queen Alexandra Range. Named by Advisory Committee on Antarctic Names (US-ACAN) for Commander N.E. Nickerson, U.S. Navy, commanding officer of USS Edisto during U.S. Navy Operation Deepfreeze 1965.

Mountains of the Ross Dependency
Shackleton Coast